North Platte High School is a K-12 school in the North Platte R-1 School District. It participates in the Kansas City Interscholastic Conference. Michelle Johnson is the principal.

References

Public high schools in Missouri
Schools in Platte County, Missouri